"Cry Out to Jesus" is a song written and recorded by Christian rock band Third Day. It was released as a single from the band's 2005 album Wherever You Are. The song was certified Gold by the RIAA on March 6, 2018.

Charts
Weekly

Decade-end

Certifications

References

2005 singles
Third Day songs
Songs written by Mac Powell
2005 songs